A multi-attribute auction is a type of auction in which the bids have multiple parts. Multi-attribute auctions allow agents to sell and purchase goods and services, taking into account more attributes than just price (e.g. service time, tolerances, qualities, etc.).

History 
The earliest research paper about a multi-attribute auction appeared in a 1994 discussion on construction contracts. In 1997, they were discussed in the context of long-term electricity contracts.

Attributes 
The structural elements of a bid are called designated attributes. Attributes may be verifiable, unverifiable, or auctioneer-provided. If bids include a single quality, such as price, the auction is referred to as a single-attribute auction. Generally, bids are prices in English auctions, and confirmations in Dutch and Japanese auctions. In Brazilian auctions, they refer to the numbers of units being traded. 

A scoring, or utility function, is essential for multi-attribute auctions, as it calculates a single number from multiple attributes, making bids that vary in multiple ways comparable.
This scoring function is announced by the auctioneer to the bidders before the start of the auction.

See also 

 Multi-attribute global inference of quality
 Multi-attribute utility

References

 Types of auction